Schellville is an unincorporated community in Sonoma County, California, United States. Schellville was named after Theodore L. Schell, who lived on a ranch nearby. The community is located in the vicinity of the junction of California State Route 12 and California State Route 121 south of Sonoma, and had a post office from 1888 to 1931. Schellville also boasted a newspaper called the Schellville Ray, which was also used to promote local plots of land for sale.Schellville has been a regionally important rail junction since completion of the Santa Rosa and Carquinez Railroad to Napa Junction in 1888. The 2 mile long Northwestern Pacific Railroad railyard is located just south of the Schellville Depot at California State Routes 12/121 and Eighth Street East. Service along the mainline was planned to start again in July 2010, from the California Northern interchange at Schellville, north to Windsor until delays pushed the start date to 2011. The depot building, which was formerly a train station, now houses railroad equipment.

Until it ended in 2014, Valley of the Moon Commute Club operated a once-daily transbay express service to San Francisco via Schellville, Sonoma, El Verano, Boyes Hot Springs, Santa Rosa, and San Rafael.

Due to its low position along Sonoma Creek, the town regularly experiences flooding in high-rain years (about every 5–10 years).

References

External links
Sonoma Wiki's article on Schellville

Unincorporated communities in California
Unincorporated communities in Sonoma County, California